Earnest Lee Ross Jr. (born January 27, 1991) is an American professional basketball player for Toyoda Gosei Scorpions of the Japanese B.League. Born in the U.S. territory of Guam, he represented the Guam national team for the first time in 2018. He played college basketball for Auburn and Missouri before beginning his professional career in Australia in 2014. He played half a season with the Perth Wildcats before an Achilles injury ended his rookie year. He continued on in Australia in 2016 with the Ballarat Miners. He then played in Denmark, New Zealand and Qatar before returning to Australia to play for the Geraldton Buccaneers in 2018. In 2019, he helped the Joondalup Wolves reach the SBL Grand Final. He later had a stint in the NBA G League for the South Bay Lakers.

Early life
Ross was born in Guam, a United States territory in Micronesia. His parents were both in the military at the time and moved around a lot early in Ross' life. He moved to Hawaii and then Japan before his parents split when Ross was 5 years old. His mother, Toy, left the military in 1996 after 15 years due to 12-hour shifts keeping her way from her two children. Ross' brother Jamel is two years younger than him. Toy moved her sons to Washington, but she struggled to find work, sending her kids during the summers to live in Texas and Maryland with their father, who was still traveling from base to base in the military and made enough money to support the kids. When Ross was 8 years old, his mother moved the family to Chicago. They first moved in with Toy's sister for a year and a half before the trio got their own apartment. In addition to Toy working long hours and maintaining multiple jobs, they lived in a rough neighborhood, and were eventually evicted from their apartment and had to move in with Toy's mother. Ross and his brother attended separate schools in the south side of Chicago. Ross was his brother's guardian, often having to cook for both of them while also having to walk him to and from school.

When Ross was 12 years old, he and his brother moved from Chicago to Washington, D.C. The brothers moved to live with their father when their mother was unable to support them. She went to court and made an agreement with her ex-husband that the children would be returned after a year and a half, enough time to get back on her feet. She lived and worked by herself in Chicago and then moved to North Carolina where her two sons would soon join her and attend high school.

Ross attended Panther Creek High School in Cary, North Carolina. As a junior in 2007–08, he earned All-State Class 4A honors after averaging 26 points, eight rebounds and five assists per game. On November 13, 2008, Ross signed a National Letter of Intent to play college basketball for Auburn University. As a senior at Panther Creek in 2008–09, Ross earned All-State Class 4A honors for the second straight year and was named the Tri-Eight Conference Player of the Year after averaging 21 points, six rebounds and five assists. He was also the leading scorer in the North Carolina vs. South Carolina All-Star Game with 16 points and had a team-high 10 rebounds.

College career

Auburn (2009–2011)
As a freshman at Auburn in 2009–10, Ross averaged 2.8 points and 3.0 rebounds in 13.4 minutes per game. He shot 28 percent from the field, 22 percent from three-point range and 64 percent from the foul line. He also started eight of 32 games, including the first seven games of the season in place of the injured Tay Waller, becoming the first Auburn freshman to start a season opener since Quantez Robertson, Josh Dollard and Joey Cameron started the 2005–06 season opener.

As a sophomore in 2010–11, Ross was the SEC's most-improved scorer, elevating his point production from 2.8 per game to 13.1 per game. He led the Tigers in scoring 13 times, including a career-high 30 points on 5-of-7 three-point shooting in an overtime loss to Georgia. He also led Auburn in rebounding 14 times, including a career-high 13 boards against Alabama on January 22, 2011. He was subsequently named Auburn's Most Valuable Player for the 2010–11 season. In 31 games (27 starts), he also averaged 6.6 rebounds, 2.1 assists and 1.4 steals in 31.8 minutes per game.

Missouri (2011–2014)
On May 25, 2011, it was announced that Ross was leaving Auburn. On June 21, 2011, he signed a grant-in-aid agreement with the University of Missouri and subsequently redshirted the 2011–12 season due to NCAA transfer regulations.

As a redshirted junior at Missouri in 2012–13, Ross averaged 10.3 points, 5.0 rebounds, 1.1 assists and 1.2 steals in 34 games with 10 starts. He was the top scorer in the Southeastern Conference off the bench, averaging 11.0 points on 44 percent shooting from the floor and 41.7 percent shooting from three-point range in 24 contests off the pine.

As a senior in 2013–14, Ross made starts in all 35 contests and averaged 14.0 points, 6.0 rebounds, 1.4 assists and 1.3 steals. He reached double figures 27 times, including seven 20-point efforts. He scored a season-high 28 points against Nevada on November 29, 2013.

College statistics

|-
| style="text-align:left;"| 2009–10
| style="text-align:left;"| Auburn
| 32 || 8 || 13.4 || .284 || .221 || .636 || 3.0 || .8 || .8 || .2 || 2.8
|-
| style="text-align:left;"| 2010–11
| style="text-align:left;"| Auburn
| 31 || 27 || 31.8 || .389 || .333 || .793 || 6.6 || 2.1 || 1.4 || .3 || 13.1
|-
| style="text-align:left;"| 2012–13
| style="text-align:left;"| Missouri
| 34 || 10 || 25.3 || .413 || .377 || .708 || 5.0 || 1.1 || 1.2 || .2 || 10.3
|-
| style="text-align:left;"| 2013–14
| style="text-align:left;"| Missouri
| 35 || 35 || 31.9 || .411 || .311 || .776 || 6.0 || 1.4 || 1.3 || .4 || 14.0
|-
| style="text-align:center;" colspan="2"|Career
| 132 || 80 || 25.7 || .392 || .322 || .760 || 5.2 || 1.3 || 1.2 || .3 || 10.1
|-

Professional career

NBA workouts
After graduating from college, Ross attended a mini-combine run by the Los Angeles Clippers and worked out with the Washington Wizards, Minnesota Timberwolves and Houston Rockets.

Perth Wildcats (2014–2015)
On September 10, 2014, Ross signed a three-year deal with the Perth Wildcats of the National Basketball League (NBL). His three-year contract included team and player options at the end of each year. As Ross was born in Guam, part of the FIBA Oceania region that includes Australia, he was signed as a domestic player — meaning he was worth three points under the NBL's player points cap system as a returning college player. The Wildcats were impressed with his NBA-ready body and his 208 cm wingspan. Listed at 105 kg, the team looked at trimming some of his weight before the start of the season, after he arrived in Perth at 120 kg.

Ross went scoreless over the first two games of the season before scoring seven points on 1-of-5 shooting and 5-of-5 free throws on October 24 against the Sydney Kings. In his fourth game for the Wildcats, on October 31 against the Wollongong Hawks, Ross scored a season-high 13 points. His only other double-digit game of the season came on December 18 against the Kings, as he scored 10 points to go with a season-high eight rebounds. On January 9, 2015, after less than 30 seconds on the court, Ross suffered a season-ending Achilles injury late in the first quarter of the Wildcats' 91–76 loss to the Cairns Taipans in Cairns. He opted to undergo surgery three days later. As a result, the Wildcats cut Ross from the roster on May 14, 2015. In 18 games for the Wildcats, he averaged 3.3 points and 2.3 rebounds per game.

Ballarat Miners (2016)
After attempting to join the ranks of the NBA Development League in November 2015, Ross signed with the Ballarat Miners of the South East Australian Basketball League on December 15, 2015.

In the Miners' season opener on April 1, 2016, Ross scored 14 points with three 3-pointers in a 93–68 loss to the Bendigo Braves. In the team's second game of the season on April 8, Ross recorded game highs of 27 points and six steals in a 97–79 win over the Basketball Australia Centre of Excellence. The next day, he scored a season-high 33 points to go with 12 rebounds in a 105–100 win over the Canberra Gunners. On April 23, he had his second 30-point game of the season, finishing with 31 points in a 95–92 loss to the NW Tasmania Thunder. On May 14, he recorded 26 points (9/15 FG, 6/10 3PT), 10 rebounds, six assists and three steals in 94–92 win over the Dandenong Rangers. He subsequently earned SEABL Player of the Week honors for Round 7. On May 29, he recorded a triple-double with 19 points, 14 rebounds and 11 assists in a 99–76 win over the Frankston Blues. He subsequently earned Player of the Week honors for Round 9. On June 4, he recorded a season-high 19 rebounds to go with 19 points and eight assists in a 93–85 win over the Hobart Chargers. On July 16, he recorded his second triple-double of the season with 26 points, 10 rebounds and 13 assists in a 112–101 loss to the Brisbane Spartans. The Miners missed a playoff berth in 2016 with an 11–13 record. In 22 games for the Miners, Ross averaged 19.9 points, 7.9 rebounds, 5.0 assists and 2.1 steals per game.

Team FOG Næstved (2016–2017)
On November 21, 2016, Ross signed with Team FOG Næstved of the Danish Basketligaen for the rest of the 2016–17 season. In his second game for Næstved on December 1, Ross recorded 16 points and 13 rebounds in a 78–76 loss to the Bakken Bears. On December 18, 2016, he scored a season-high 28 points in a 117–82 win over SISU BK. In January 2017, he helped Næstved win the Danish Cup, as they garnered an 81–80 win over Horsens IC in the final. Næstved finished the regular season in fourth place with a 13–15 record and went on to lose to Svendborg Rabbits in the quarter-finals in a 3–0 sweep. In 23 games for Næstved, Ross averaged 14.7 points, 6.4 rebounds, 1.7 assists and 1.6 steals per game.

Super City Rangers (2017)
Following his final game with Næstved on March 27, 2017, Ross left Denmark and travelled to New Zealand, landing in Auckland on March 31 to join the Super City Rangers for the rest of the 2017 New Zealand NBL season. He made his debut for the Rangers on April 8, scoring 16 points off the bench in a 100–73 loss to the Southland Sharks. Seven days later, he recorded game highs of 32 points and 10 rebounds in a 99–87 win over the Nelson Giants. In the Rangers' regular season finale on June 10, Ross scored a game-high 25 points in a 102–82 win over the Canterbury Rams. The Rangers finished the regular season in third place with an 11–7 record, and lost to the second-seeded Southland Sharks 106–67 in their semi-final match-up. Ross scored 10 points in the loss. In 15 games for the Rangers, he averaged 19.1 points, 5.8 rebounds, 1.6 assists and 1.5 steals per game.

Al Wakrah (2017–2018)
In November 2017, Ross joined Al Wakrah of the Qatari Basketball League. He helped Al Wakrah finish the regular season in fourth place with a 10–6 record and helped them reach the Qatari League final, where they were defeated 61–59 by Al Arabi. Ross appeared in all 19 games for the team, averaging 19.9 points, 8.7 rebounds, 3.0 assists and 1.8 steals per game.

Geraldton Buccaneers (2018)
On January 30, 2018, Ross signed with the Geraldton Buccaneers for the 2018 State Basketball League season. In his debut for the Buccaneers on May 5, 2018, Ross recorded 18 points, 15 rebounds and eight assists in an 88–82 win over the Stirling Senators. On June 4, he competed in the SBL All-Star Game for the North All-Stars, coming off the bench to record 13 points, eight rebounds and six assists in a 123–110 win over the South All-Stars. Five days later, he scored 30 points in a 90–80 win over the Perth Redbacks. On July 7, he scored 26 points in a 109–104 win over the Cockburn Cougars. The following day, he scored 29 points in a 103–94 win over the Lakeside Lightning. He subsequently earned Player of the Week honors for Round 17. Ross helped the Buccaneers finish the regular season as minor premiers with a 23–3 record. They went on to lose in a quarter-final sweep to the eighth-seeded Rockingham Flames despite Ross' game-high 34 points in game two. In 20 games, he averaged 20.6 points, 7.1 rebounds, 4.0 assists and 1.9 steals per game.

Al Ahli (2018–2019)
In December 2018, Ross joined Al Ahli of the Qatari Basketball League, returning to the country for a second stint. He appeared in all 16 games for the team, averaging 18.6 points, 7.4 rebounds, 3.6 assists and 2.4 steals per game.

Joondalup Wolves (2019)
On October 19, 2018, Ross signed with the Joondalup Wolves for the 2019 State Basketball League season. In his debut for the Wolves on March 15, 2019, Ross recorded game highs of 25 points and eight assists in a 112–76 season-opening win over the Perry Lakes Hawks. A day later, he recorded 25 points and a game-high 15 rebounds in a 91–83 win over the Goldfields Giants. On April 14, he scored 33 points in a 102–79 win over the Kalamunda Eastern Suns. On April 18, he had 33 points and 11 rebounds in a 98–92 loss to the Rockingham Flames. On June 1, he suffered a back injury after taking a hard fall in the opening minutes of the Wolves' 115–55 win over the South West Slammers. He went on to lead the Wolves to the minor premiership with a 20–6 record, with the team going on to reach the SBL Grand Final. In the grand final, the Wolves lost 92–80 to the Geraldton Buccaneers despite Ross' 16 points and 12 rebounds. In 30 games, he averaged 19.47 points, 8.07 rebounds and 4.2 assists per game.

South Bay Lakers (2019)
On October 26, 2019, after a successful try-out, Ross was added to the training camp roster of the South Bay Lakers of the NBA G League. He went on to make the opening night roster on November 4. He was waived on December 3. He averaged 1.8 points and 1.3 rebounds in four games.

West Adelaide Bearcats (2021)
On March 12, 2021, Ross signed with the West Adelaide Bearcats for the 2021 NBL1 Central season. In his debut for the Bearcats on April 10, he scored 21 points in an 83–76 loss to the Central Districts Lions. On April 23, he recorded 35 points and 16 rebounds in a 91–84 win over the Norwood Flames. On May 8, he recorded 22 points, 15 rebounds and 10 assists in a 110–69 win over the Eastern Mavericks. On May 29, he recorded 32 points, 19 rebounds and seven assists in a 93–90 loss to the Forestville Eagles. In 18 games, he averaged 19.11 points, 11.05 rebounds and 3.16 assists per game.

Yokohama Excellence (2021–2022)
On July 30, 2021, Ross signed with Yokohama Excellence of the Japanese B.League third division. In 44 games during the 2021–22 season, he averaged 13.5 points, 7.8 rebounds, 2.1 assists and 1.4 steals per game.

Toyoda Gosei Scorpions (2022–present)
On July 12, 2022, Ross signed with Toyoda Gosei Scorpions of the Japanese B.League third division.

National team career
In November 2018, Ross played for the Guam national team in the 2021 FIBA Asia Cup pre-qualifiers, helping Guam go undefeated. In February 2020, he played for Guam in the 2021 FIBA Asia Cup qualifiers.

Personal
Ross is the son of Earnest Ross Sr. and Toy Miller. More than 20 tattoos adorn Ross' body, each holding strong significance in relation to his values, family, and upbringing. His most important ink is that which references those closest to his heart – his mother, brother, and late grandmother – with their names and the words 'Family first'. The words Toy Miller are separately tattooed on his wrists, something that serves as a constant reminder of the one person in his world he owes everything to. His father has remarried twice, and as of March 2013, he was still active in the military. His father's cousin is former NBA player Gerald Glass.

Ross is a Christian and he states being raised by a mother with a strong Christian faith plays an important role in all of his actions.

Ross has an Australian wife and daughter.

References

External links
Toyoda Gosei Scorpions profile
Yokohama Excellence profile
FIBA profile
Missouri Tigers bio
Auburn Tigers bio
"Player Piece: Earnest Ross" at nbl.com.au

1991 births
Living people
American expatriate basketball people in Australia
American expatriate basketball people in Denmark
American expatriate basketball people in Japan
American expatriate basketball people in New Zealand
American expatriate basketball people in Qatar
American men's basketball players
Auburn Tigers men's basketball players
Basketball players from Chicago
Basketball players from North Carolina
Missouri Tigers men's basketball players
Perth Wildcats players
Shooting guards
Small forwards
South Bay Lakers players
Super City Rangers players